General the Honourable Henry St John (1738 – 3 April 1818) was a senior British Army officer and politician who sat in the House of Commons from 1768 to 1784 and briefly in 1802. He also served as a Groom of the Bedchamber.

Early life
He was the younger son of John St John, 2nd Viscount St John and his wife Anne Furnese. His elder brother was Frederick St John, 2nd Viscount Bolingbroke. His younger sister, the Hon. Louisa St John, married William Bagot, 1st Baron Bagot.

His paternal grandparents were Henry St John, 1st Viscount St John and the former Angelica Magdalena (née Pellisary) Wharton, the widow of Philip Wharton who was the daughter of George Pellisary, Treasurer-General of the Navy to King Louis XIV of France. His mother was the half-sister, and heiress, of Sir Henry Furnese, 3rd Baronet, and the only child, by his first wife Anna Balam (daughter of Anthony Balam), of Sir Robert Furnese, 2nd Baronet, MP for Truro, New Romney, and Kent.

St John was educated at Eton College.

Career
He joined the British Army in 1754 as an ensign in the Coldstream Regiment of Foot Guards from which he was promoted in 1758 to the rank of captain in the 18th (The Royal Irish) Regiment of Foot, then stationed in Ireland. In 1760 he was promoted Major in the 91st Regiment of Foot, made Lieutenant-Colonel in 1762 and put on half pay in 1763.

In 1767, he was appointed to the 67th Regiment of Foot, then on garrison duty in Minorca. He received the brevet rank of colonel in 1776, and was appointed colonel of the 36th Regiment of Foot in 1778, a position he held until his death. He was advanced to the rank of major-general in 1779, to that of lieutenant-general in 1787, and made full general on 26 January 1797.

He was appointed Groom of the Bedchamber to the Duke of York in 1737 and to the king from 1771 to 1784.

He was elected Member of Parliament for Wootton Bassett in 1761, sitting until 1784 and again in 1802, vacating his seat the same year.

Personal life
In 1771, St John was married to Barbara Bladen (1733–1821), the eldest daughter, and co-heiress, of Thomas Bladen and the former Barbara Janssen (a daughter of Sir Theodore Janssen, 1st Baronet). Barbara was the sister of Harriet Bladen, the Dowager Countess of Essex (from her marriage to William Capell, 4th Earl of Essex).

St John died, without issue, on 3 April 1818.

References

|-

1738 births
1818 deaths
British Army generals
Royal Irish Regiment (1684–1922) officers
67th Regiment of Foot officers
36th Regiment of Foot officers
Members of the Parliament of Great Britain for English constituencies
British MPs 1761–1768
British MPs 1768–1774
British MPs 1774–1780
British MPs 1780–1784
Members of the Parliament of the United Kingdom for English constituencies
UK MPs 1802–1806
Younger sons of viscounts
People educated at Eton College